Julia Ziegler (born 21 May 1984) is a Malaysian actress and model. Ziegler got her start as a model and actress for Malaysian TV commercials. She has appeared on the covers of local magazines and has also acted in television series' for the Malaysian market.

Early life
Ziegler was born in Kuala Lumpur and raised in Ampang, Selangor Her mother is Malaysian and her father is American.

Personal life
Julia married Johan, a mechanical engineer, on 1 January 2017.

Filmography

Film
 Jangan Tegur (2009)

Dramas
 KL Menjerit The Series (2008)
 Qanun 99 (Episode 5)
 Tanah Kubur Season 6 (Episode Dosa Karib) 
 Bahagia Kasihmu (2017)
 Selamat Malam Tan Sri (2018)

Programme
 Meja Bulat Sepahtu (2017) - guest

References

 http://ww1.utusan.com.my/utusan/Hiburan/20140302/hi_13/Julia-Ziegler-pilih-sahabat-baik

1984 births
Living people
Malaysian actresses
Malaysian female models
Malaysian people of American descent
Malaysian people of Malay descent
Malaysian Muslims